Aného, previously known as Anecho, is a town in southeastern Togo, lying on the Gulf of Guinea near the border of Benin. Founded in the late 17th century by Ane people fleeing from Denkyira attacks in Elmina (now in Ghana), Aného developed as a slave port and commercial center. It was the capital of German Togoland from 1885 to 1887 and of the French occupation from 1914 to 1920. Aného remains an important intellectual center for Togo, though it has not grown as rapidly as Togo’s other major cities. Its estimated population in 2005 was 25,400.

It is situated 45 km east of the capital Lomé, between the Atlantic Ocean and Lake Togo in Maritime Region. Historically it was known as Petit Popo and it had a Portuguese slave market. The nearby town of Zebe became the second capital of German Togoland in 1887. It gradually declined in importance after the capital was transferred to Lomé in 1897, a decline exacerbated by coastal erosion.

The town's main industries are farming and fishing, while it is still a center for Voodoo.  Notable buildings include Aneho Protestant Church (built in 1895) and Aneho Peter and Paul Church, cathedral of the Roman Catholic Diocese of Aného, dating from 1898.  These buildings were together added to the UNESCO Tentative List on December 12, 2000, in the Cultural category.

References

External links

Communes page

Populated places in Maritime Region
Cantons of Togo